The Perth Central Baptist Church was a church building in Perth, Western Australia. The church was completed in 1899 and demolished in 1979 to make way for the Alexander Library Building. The foundation stone for the church was incorporated into the library building.

The church was officially opened on 5 May 1899.

References

Former churches in Australia
Baptist churches in Australia
Churches in Perth, Western Australia
Buildings and structures demolished in 1979
Churches completed in 1899
1899 establishments in Australia
1979 disestablishments in Australia
Demolished buildings and structures in Western Australia